is a Japanese modern pentathlete. He competed at the 1972 Summer Olympics.

References

External links
 

1942 births
Living people
Japanese male modern pentathletes
Olympic modern pentathletes of Japan
Modern pentathletes at the 1972 Summer Olympics
20th-century Japanese people
21st-century Japanese people